The Braille pattern dots-25 is a 6-dot braille cell with both middle dots raised, or an 8-dot braille cell with both upper-middle dots raised. It is represented by the Unicode code point U+2812, and in Braille ASCII with the number 3.

Unified Braille

In unified international braille, the braille pattern dots-25 is used to represent a colon or other punctuation or mathematical operators.

Table of unified braille values

Other braille

Plus dots 7 and 8

Related to Braille pattern dots-25 are Braille patterns 257, 258, and 2578, which are used in 8-dot braille systems, such as Gardner-Salinas and Luxembourgish Braille.

Related 8-dot kantenji patterns

In the Japanese kantenji braille, the standard 8-dot Braille patterns 36, 136, 346, and 1346 are the patterns related to Braille pattern dots-25, since the two additional dots of kantenji patterns 025, 257, and 0257 are placed above the base 6-dot cell, instead of below, as in standard 8-dot braille.

Kantenji using braille patterns 36, 136, 346, or 1346

This listing includes kantenji using Braille pattern dots-25 for all 6349 kanji found in JIS C 6226-1978.

  - 宿

Variants and thematic compounds

 ⠃⠬ -  selector 1 + 宿  =  元
 ⠃⠂⠬ -  selector 1 + selector 1 + 宿  =  兀
 ⠅⠤⠬ -  selector 2 + 宿 + 宿  =  丿
 ⠑⠬ -  selector 4 + 宿  =  儿
 ⠡⠬ -  selector 5 + 宿  =  亢
 ⢁⠬ -  selector 6 + 宿  =  兌
 ⠥⠊ -  宿 + selector 1  =  写
 ⠥⡈ -  宿 + selector 3  =  冖
 ⠥⠘ -  宿 + selector 4  =  与
 ⠥⠤⠘ -  宿 + 宿 + selector 4  =  與
 ⠱⠬ -  比 + 宿  =  中
 ⢑⠬ -  仁/亻 + 宿  =  介
 ⢡⠬ -  数 + 宿  =  兆
 ⢵⠬ -  そ/馬 + 宿  =  争

Compounds of 宿

 ⠇⠬ -  い/糹/# + 宿  =  縮

Compounds of ⼧

 ⠥⣞ -  宿 + へ/⺩  =  害
 ⠥⡚ -  宿 + ぬ/力  =  割
 ⠥⡪ -  宿 + た/⽥  =  豁
 ⣷⠤⣞ -  め/目 + 宿 + へ/⺩  =  瞎
 ⠥⢊ -  宿 + か/金  =  宇
 ⠥⢎ -  宿 + き/木  =  宋
 ⠥⠼ -  宿 + ろ/十  =  宏
 ⢱⠤⠼ -  氷/氵 + 宿 + ろ/十  =  浤
 ⢅⠤⠼ -  ⺼ + 宿 + ろ/十  =  肱
 ⠥⠾ -  宿 + れ/口  =  客
 ⠷⠤⠾ -  れ/口 + 宿 + れ/口  =  喀
 ⠥⣌ -  宿 + 日  =  宴
 ⠥⢼ -  宿 + そ/馬  =  宵
 ⠥⣚ -  宿 + ふ/女  =  富
 ⠃⠤⣚ -  selector 1 + 宿 + ふ/女  =  冨
 ⢥⠤⣚ -  心 + +宿 + ふ/女  =  蔔
 ⣳⠤⣚ -  む/車 + 宿 + ふ/女  =  蝠
 ⣇⠤⣚ -  ひ/辶 + 宿 + ふ/女  =  逼
 ⠥⡬ -  宿 + ゑ/訁  =  寝
 ⠥⠤⡬ -  宿 + 宿 + ゑ/訁  =  寢
 ⠥⡾ -  宿 + て/扌  =  寧
 ⠷⠤⡾ -  れ/口 + 宿 + て/扌  =  嚀
 ⢥⠤⡾ -  心 + 宿 + て/扌  =  檸
 ⡇⠤⡾ -  に/氵 + 宿 + て/扌  =  濘
 ⢗⠤⡾ -  け/犬 + 宿 + て/扌  =  獰
 ⣧⠤⡾ -  み/耳 + 宿 + て/扌  =  聹
 ⠥⣪ -  宿 + ま/石  =  寵
 ⠥⢪ -  宿 + さ/阝  =  搾
 ⠥⡜ -  宿 + の/禾  =  稼
 ⠥⣘ -  宿 + ゆ/彳  =  窒
 ⢅⠤⣘ -  ⺼ + 宿 + ゆ/彳  =  膣
 ⠥⢜ -  宿 + こ/子  =  窓
 ⠥⣮ -  宿 + み/耳  =  窮
 ⢑⠤⡾ -  仁/亻 + 宿 + て/扌  =  佇
 ⣓⠤⠚ -  ふ/女 + 宿 + う/宀/#  =  婉
 ⠓⠤⣎ -  う/宀/# + 宿 + ひ/辶  =  它
 ⠓⠤⣪ -  う/宀/# + 宿 + ま/石  =  宕
 ⠓⠤⢚ -  う/宀/# + 宿 + く/艹  =  寞
 ⠓⠤⠚ -  う/宀/# + 宿 + う/宀/#  =  寥
 ⠓⠤⢎ -  う/宀/# + 宿 + き/木  =  寨
 ⠓⠤⠺ -  う/宀/# + 宿 + る/忄  =  寰
 ⢇⠤⣎ -  き/木 + 宿 + ひ/辶  =  柁
 ⢇⠤⠚ -  き/木 + 宿 + う/宀/#  =  椀
 ⡇⠤⣎ -  に/氵 + 宿 + ひ/辶  =  沱
 ⡕⠤⠚ -  の/禾 + 宿 + う/宀/#  =  糘
 ⢷⠤⠪ -  せ/食 + 宿 + ら/月  =  舘
 ⣓⠤⣎ -  ふ/女 + 宿 + ひ/辶  =  舵
 ⣳⠤⠚ -  む/車 + 宿 + う/宀/#  =  蜿
 ⠓⠤⡬ -  う/宀/# + 宿 + ゑ/訁  =  謇
 ⢃⠤⠚ -  か/金 + 宿 + う/宀/#  =  鋺
 ⠥⠤⢜ -  宿 + 宿 + こ/子  =  窗
 ⣣⠤⠚ -  ま/石 + 宿 + う/宀/#  =  碗
 ⠥⠤⢜ -  宿 + 宿 + こ/子  =  窗
 ⠓⠤⣸ -  う/宀/# + 宿 + 火  =  窰
 ⠓⠤⢨ -  う/宀/# + 宿 + 数  =  窶
 ⣱⠤⠮ -  火 + 宿 + り/分  =  竈

Compounds of 元 and 兀

 ⣗⠬ -  へ/⺩ + 宿  =  玩
 ⠥⠜ -  宿 + お/頁  =  頑
 ⡗⠤⠜ -  ね/示 + 宿 + お/頁  =  頴
 ⠓⠬ -  う/宀/# + 宿  =  完
 ⢣⠬ -  さ/阝 + 宿  =  院
 ⠥⢮ -  宿 + し/巿  =  冠
 ⢓⠤⢮ -  く/艹 + 宿 + し/巿  =  蒄
 ⡇⠒⠬ -  に/氵 + う/宀/# + 宿  =  浣
 ⣅⠒⠬ -  日 + う/宀/# + 宿  =  皖
 ⢥⠒⠬ -  心 + う/宀/# + 宿  =  莞
 ⠥⠂⠬ -  宿 + selector 1 + 宿  =  冦
 ⠓⠂⠬ -  う/宀/# + selector 1 + 宿  =  寇
 ⣳⠂⠬ -  む/車 + selector 1 + 宿  =  翫
 ⢥⠂⠬ -  心 + selector 1 + 宿  =  芫
 ⢣⠂⠬ -  さ/阝 + selector 1 + 宿  =  阮
 ⡃⠤⡺ -  な/亻 + 宿 + つ/土  =  僥
 ⡑⠤⡺ -  や/疒 + 宿 + つ/土  =  嶢
 ⡷⠤⣈ -  て/扌 + 宿 + 龸  =  撓
 ⢇⠤⣈ -  き/木 + 宿 + 龸  =  橈
 ⠇⠤⡺ -  い/糹/# + 宿 + つ/土  =  繞
 ⣳⠤⡺ -  む/車 + 宿 + つ/土  =  蟯
 ⣇⠤⡺ -  ひ/辶 + 宿 + つ/土  =  遶
 ⢃⠤⡺ -  か/金 + 宿 + つ/土  =  鐃
 ⢷⠤⡺ -  せ/食 + 宿 + つ/土  =  饒
 ⢵⠤⡺ -  そ/馬 + 宿 + つ/土  =  驍

Compounds of 儿 and 丿

 ⡓⠬ -  ぬ/力 + 宿  =  免
 ⠥⠬ -  宿 + 宿  =  冤
 ⣅⠬ -  日 + 宿  =  晩
 ⣃⠬ -  は/辶 + 宿  =  逸
 ⡃⡒⠬ -  な/亻 + ぬ/力 + 宿  =  俛
 ⣅⡒⠬ -  日 + ぬ/力 + 宿  =  冕
 ⣓⡒⠬ -  ふ/女 + ぬ/力 + 宿  =  娩
 ⠓⡒⠬ -  う/宀/# + ぬ/力 + 宿  =  寃
 ⠳⡒⠬ -  る/忄 + ぬ/力 + 宿  =  悗
 ⢥⡒⠬ -  心 + ぬ/力 + 宿  =  菟
 ⡑⡒⠬ -  や/疒 + ぬ/力 + 宿  =  巉
 ⠇⡒⠬ -  い/糹/# + ぬ/力 + 宿  =  纔
 ⠗⡒⠬ -  え/訁 + ぬ/力 + 宿  =  讒
 ⢕⠬ -  こ/子 + 宿  =  児
 ⢕⢔⠬ -  こ/子 + こ/子 + 宿  =  兒
 ⡃⢔⠬ -  な/亻 + こ/子 + 宿  =  倪
 ⢵⢔⠬ -  そ/馬 + こ/子 + 宿  =  貎
 ⡧⢔⠬ -  ち/竹 + こ/子 + 宿  =  霓
 ⣵⢔⠬ -  も/門 + こ/子 + 宿  =  鬩
 ⢷⢔⠬ -  せ/食 + こ/子 + 宿  =  鯢
 ⣷⠬ -  め/目 + 宿  =  見
 ⢗⠬ -  け/犬 + 宿  =  規
 ⢥⢖⠬ -  心 + け/犬 + 宿  =  槻
 ⠥⣾ -  宿 + め/目  =  寛
 ⣷⠤⣺ -  め/目 + 宿 + む/車  =  覯
 ⡃⣶⠬ -  な/亻 + め/目 + 宿  =  俔
 ⣣⣶⠬ -  ま/石 + め/目 + 宿  =  硯
 ⡧⣶⠬ -  ち/竹 + め/目 + 宿  =  筧
 ⣳⣶⠬ -  む/車 + め/目 + 宿  =  蜆
 ⣁⣶⠬ -  龸 + め/目 + 宿  =  覓
 ⠷⣶⠬ -  れ/口 + め/目 + 宿  =  覘
 ⢑⣶⠬ -  仁/亻 + め/目 + 宿  =  覡
 ⣑⣶⠬ -  ゆ/彳 + め/目 + 宿  =  覦
 ⡵⣶⠬ -  と/戸 + め/目 + 宿  =  覩
 ⡑⣶⠬ -  や/疒 + め/目 + 宿  =  覬
 ⢇⣶⠬ -  き/木 + め/目 + 宿  =  覲
 ⣷⣶⠬ -  め/目 + め/目 + 宿  =  靦
 ⡷⠤⠬ -  て/扌 + 宿 + 宿  =  挽
 ⣳⠤⠬ -  む/車 + 宿 + 宿  =  輓
 ⡷⠤⠬ -  て/扌 + 宿 + 宿  =  挽
 ⣳⠤⠬ -  む/車 + 宿 + 宿  =  輓
 ⣳⠤⣈ -  む/車 + 宿 + 龸  =  允
 ⠧⠤⠬ -  り/分 + 宿 + 宿  =  兜
 ⠷⠤⣺ -  れ/口 + 宿 + む/車  =  吮
 ⢗⠤⠬ -  け/犬 + 宿 + 宿  =  猊
 ⠥⣴⢈ -  宿 + も/門 + selector 6  =  兇
 ⠧⠤⠬ -  り/分 + 宿 + 宿  =  兜
 ⢗⠤⠬ -  け/犬 + 宿 + 宿  =  猊
 ⠥⣄⠊ -  宿 + 日 + selector 1  =  皃
 ⢵⠤⠬ -  そ/馬 + 宿 + 宿  =  羌

Compounds of 亢

 ⡳⠬ -  つ/土 + 宿  =  坑
 ⡷⠬ -  て/扌 + 宿  =  抗
 ⢇⠬ -  き/木 + 宿  =  杭
 ⣓⠬ -  ふ/女 + 宿  =  航
 ⠥⣈ -  宿 + 龸  =  冗
 ⠳⠤⣈ -  る/忄 + 宿 + 龸  =  忱
 ⣷⠤⣈ -  め/目 + 宿 + 龸  =  眈
 ⠷⠠⠬ -  れ/口 + selector 5 + 宿  =  吭
 ⡃⠤⠬ -  な/亻 + 宿 + 宿  =  伉
 ⠕⠤⠬ -  お/頁 + 宿 + 宿  =  頏

Compounds of ⼇

 ⠥⡞ -  宿 + ね/示  =  衰
 ⢇⠤⡞ -  き/木 + 宿 + ね/示  =  榱
 ⡧⠤⡞ -  ち/竹 + 宿 + ね/示  =  簑
 ⢓⠤⡞ -  く/艹 + 宿 + ね/示  =  蓑
 ⠥⡖⠊ -  宿 + ね/示 + selector 1  =  袞
 ⠥⡊ -  宿 + な/亻  =  褒
 ⢕⠤⠜ -  こ/子 + 宿 + お/頁  =  孰
 ⡷⠤⣮ -  て/扌 + 宿 + み/耳  =  攘
 ⢕⠤⢸ -  こ/子 + 宿 + 氷/氵  =  敦
 ⣅⠤⢸ -  日 + 宿 + 氷/氵  =  暾
 ⢇⠤⢚ -  き/木 + 宿 + く/艹  =  梳
 ⡣⠤⢺ -  た/⽥ + 宿 + す/発  =  畆
 ⣁⠤⢾ -  龸 + 宿 + せ/食  =  鶉
 ⡳⠤⣎ -  つ/土 + 宿 + ひ/辶  =  壅
 ⣱⠤⢸ -  火 + 宿 + 氷/氵  =  燉
 ⡗⠤⣮ -  ね/示 + 宿 + み/耳  =  禳
 ⢃⠤⢸ -  か/金 + 宿 + 氷/氵  =  鐓
 ⢵⠤⣮ -  そ/馬 + 宿 + み/耳  =  驤
 ⢵⠤⢞ -  そ/馬 + 宿 + け/犬  =  驩
 ⢱⠤⠾ -  氷/氵 + 宿 + れ/口  =  凛

Compounds of 兌

 ⠷⠬ -  れ/口 + 宿  =  兄
 ⠵⠬ -  ろ/十 + 宿  =  克
 ⠵⠶⠬ -  ろ/十 + れ/口 + 宿  =  兢
 ⠵⠤⡚ -  ろ/十 + 宿 + ぬ/力  =  剋
 ⣁⠬ -  龸 + 宿  =  党
 ⣁⣀⠬ -  龸 + 龸 + 宿  =  黨
 ⡃⣀⠬ -  な/亻 + 龸 + 宿  =  儻
 ⣥⠬ -  囗 + 宿  =  呪
 ⢱⠬ -  氷/氵 + 宿  =  況
 ⢱⢰⠬ -  氷/氵 + 氷/氵 + 宿  =  况
 ⡗⠬ -  ね/示 + 宿  =  祝
 ⣣⠬ -  ま/石 + 宿  =  競
 ⣣⣢⠬ -  ま/石 + ま/石 + 宿  =  竸
 ⠳⠬ -  る/忄 + 宿  =  悦
 ⡕⠬ -  の/禾 + 宿  =  税
 ⢅⠬ -  ⺼ + 宿  =  脱
 ⠗⠬ -  え/訁 + 宿  =  説
 ⢃⠬ -  か/金 + 宿  =  鋭
 ⣵⠬ -  も/門 + 宿  =  閲
 ⣳⣀⠬ -  む/車 + 龸 + 宿  =  蛻

Compounds of 写

 ⠥⠤⠊ -  宿 + 宿 + selector 1  =  冩
 ⠓⠤⠊ -  う/宀/# + 宿 + selector 1  =  寫
 ⡇⠤⠊ -  に/氵 + 宿 + selector 1  =  瀉

Compounds of 冖

 ⠥⣺ -  宿 + む/車  =  軍
 ⣅⠤⣺ -  日 + 宿 + む/車  =  暈
 ⡇⠤⣺ -  に/氵 + 宿 + む/車  =  渾
 ⣗⠤⣺ -  へ/⺩ + 宿 + む/車  =  琿
 ⣇⠤⣺ -  ひ/辶 + 宿 + む/車  =  皹
 ⢓⠤⣺ -  く/艹 + 宿 + む/車  =  葷
 ⠗⠤⣺ -  え/訁 + 宿 + む/車  =  諢
 ⣳⠬ -  む/車 + 宿  =  風
 ⣳⠤⢞ -  む/車 + 宿 + け/犬  =  飆
 ⡑⣲⠬ -  や/疒 + む/車 + 宿  =  瘋
 ⠗⣲⠬ -  え/訁 + む/車 + 宿  =  諷
 ⣁⣲⠬ -  龸 + む/車 + 宿  =  颪
 ⣣⣲⠬ -  ま/石 + む/車 + 宿  =  颯
 ⠥⣜ -  宿 + ほ/方  =  夙
 ⣵⠤⡈ -  も/門 + 宿 + selector 3  =  匸
 ⣵⠤⢮ -  も/門 + 宿 + し/巿  =  匝
 ⣵⠤⠮ -  も/門 + 宿 + り/分  =  匳
 ⠷⠤⣾ -  れ/口 + 宿 + め/目  =  嚏
 ⣱⠤⡺ -  火 + 宿 + つ/土  =  塋
 ⡳⠤⠊ -  つ/土 + 宿 + selector 1  =  壷
 ⢕⠤⠼ -  こ/子 + 宿 + ろ/十  =  孛
 ⠳⠤⠼ -  る/忄 + 宿 + ろ/十  =  悖
 ⡷⠤⣾ -  て/扌 + 宿 + め/目  =  攪
 ⣅⠤⢼ -  日 + 宿 + そ/馬  =  曚
 ⠣⠤⢼ -  ら/月 + 宿 + そ/馬  =  朦
 ⢇⠤⣜ -  き/木 + 宿 + ほ/方  =  榜
 ⢥⠤⢼ -  心 + 宿 + そ/馬  =  檬
 ⡇⠤⣜ -  に/氵 + 宿 + ほ/方  =  滂
 ⢱⠤⢚ -  氷/氵 + 宿 + く/艹  =  濛
 ⣷⠤⢼ -  め/目 + 宿 + そ/馬  =  矇
 ⣣⠤⣜ -  ま/石 + 宿 + ほ/方  =  磅
 ⢅⠤⣜ -  ⺼ + 宿 + ほ/方  =  膀
 ⣓⠤⢚ -  ふ/女 + 宿 + く/艹  =  艨
 ⢓⠤⢼ -  く/艹 + 宿 + そ/馬  =  蒙
 ⣳⠤⣪ -  む/車 + 宿 + ま/石  =  蠧
 ⠓⠤⢼ -  う/宀/# + 宿 + そ/馬  =  騫
 ⠥⠤⢾ -  宿 + 宿 + せ/食  =  鶤
 ⣱⠤⢾ -  火 + 宿 + せ/食  =  鶯
 ⠥⢒⢮ -  宿 + く/艹 + し/巿  =  冪
 ⠥⠐⣎ -  宿 + selector 4 + ひ/辶  =  皸
 ⠥⠤⢾ -  宿 + 宿 + せ/食  =  鶤

Compounds of 与 and 與

 ⡑⠤⠘ -  や/疒 + 宿 + selector 4  =  嶼
 ⣡⠤⠘ -  ん/止 + 宿 + selector 4  =  歟
 ⣡⠤⣼ -  ん/止 + 宿 + も/門  =  丐
 ⠧⠤⣼ -  り/分 + 宿 + も/門  =  兮
 ⡓⠤⢞ -  ぬ/力 + 宿 + け/犬  =  刳
 ⠳⠤⢞ -  る/忄 + 宿 + け/犬  =  愕
 ⣷⠤⠚ -  め/目 + 宿 + う/宀/#  =  眄
 ⡧⠤⣨ -  ち/竹 + 宿 + ん/止  =  篶
 ⣧⠤⡪ -  み/耳 + 宿 + た/⽥  =  聘
 ⢅⠤⢞ -  ⺼ + 宿 + け/犬  =  胯
 ⢳⠤⣼ -  す/発 + 宿 + も/門  =  虧
 ⡗⠤⢞ -  ね/示 + 宿 + け/犬  =  袴
 ⠗⠤⣼ -  え/訁 + 宿 + も/門  =  諡
 ⠗⠤⢞ -  え/訁 + 宿 + け/犬  =  諤
 ⣧⠤⢞ -  み/耳 + 宿 + け/犬  =  跨
 ⣳⠤⣬ -  む/車 + 宿 + 囗  =  輿
 ⣓⠤⣼ -  ふ/女 + 宿 + も/門  =  娉
 ⢳⠤⣨ -  す/発 + 宿 + ん/止  =  麪

Compounds of 中

 ⡃⠬ -  な/亻 + 宿  =  仲
 ⡃⠤⠺ -  な/亻 + 宿 + る/忄  =  僂
 ⡇⠬ -  に/氵 + 宿  =  沖
 ⡇⠤⡨ -  に/氵 + 宿 + を/貝  =  潰
 ⡇⡆⠬ -  に/氵 + に/氵 + 宿  =  冲
 ⠥⢬ -  宿 + 心  =  忠
 ⢗⠰⠬ -  け/犬 + 比 + 宿  =  狆
 ⣇⠰⠬ -  ひ/辶 + 比 + 宿  =  迚
 ⠷⠤⣬ -  れ/口 + 宿 + 囗  =  串
 ⡑⠤⠺ -  や/疒 + 宿 + る/忄  =  瘻
 ⡗⠤⠺ -  ね/示 + 宿 + る/忄  =  褸
 ⢃⠤⠺ -  か/金 + 宿 + る/忄  =  鏤
 ⡧⠤⢨ -  ち/竹 + 宿 + 数  =  籔
 ⣳⠤⠺ -  む/車 + 宿 + る/忄  =  螻

Compounds of 介

 ⡣⠬ -  た/⽥ + 宿  =  界
 ⡳⡢⠬ -  つ/土 + た/⽥ + 宿  =  堺
 ⠧⢐⠬ -  り/分 + 仁/亻 + 宿  =  个
 ⡃⢐⠬ -  な/亻 + 仁/亻 + 宿  =  价
 ⡣⢐⠬ -  た/⽥ + 仁/亻 + 宿  =  畍
 ⡑⢐⠬ -  や/疒 + 仁/亻 + 宿  =  疥

Compounds of 兆

 ⢥⠬ -  心 + 宿  =  桃
 ⡥⠬ -  ゑ/訁 + 宿  =  誂
 ⣧⠬ -  み/耳 + 宿  =  跳
 ⣇⠬ -  ひ/辶 + 宿  =  逃
 ⡃⢠⠬ -  な/亻 + 数 + 宿  =  佻
 ⡷⢠⠬ -  て/扌 + 数 + 宿  =  挑
 ⣅⢠⠬ -  日 + 数 + 宿  =  晁
 ⠓⢠⠬ -  う/宀/# + 数 + 宿  =  窕
 ⢃⢠⠬ -  か/金 + 数 + 宿  =  銚
 ⣓⠤⠬ -  ふ/女 + 宿 + 宿  =  姚
 ⣓⠤⠬ -  ふ/女 + 宿 + 宿  =  姚

Compounds of 争

 ⢷⠬ -  せ/食 + 宿  =  静
 ⡇⢶⠬ -  に/氵 + せ/食 + 宿  =  瀞
 ⢷⢶⠬ -  せ/食 + せ/食 + 宿  =  靜
 ⢵⢴⠬ -  そ/馬 + そ/馬 + 宿  =  爭
 ⡑⢴⠬ -  や/疒 + そ/馬 + 宿  =  崢
 ⡧⢴⠬ -  ち/竹 + そ/馬 + 宿  =  箏
 ⠗⢴⠬ -  え/訁 + そ/馬 + 宿  =  諍
 ⢃⢴⠬ -  か/金 + そ/馬 + 宿  =  錚

Non-compounding

For many kantenji, a middle cell of ⠤ serves only to distinguish between two-cell patterns that could be interpreted in multiple ways, e.g. ⢱⡎ = 淫, while ⢱⠤⡎ = 冰.

 ⡃⠤⠼ -  な/亻 + 宿 + ろ/十  =  什
 ⡃⠤⡚ -  な/亻 + 宿 + ぬ/力  =  仂
 ⡃⠤⡼ -  な/亻 + 宿 + と/戸  =  仆
 ⡃⠤⢘ -  な/亻 + 宿 + 仁/亻  =  从
 ⡃⠤⣺ -  な/亻 + 宿 + む/車  =  俥
 ⡃⠤⣼ -  な/亻 + 宿 + も/門  =  們
 ⢱⠤⡎ -  氷/氵 + 宿 + に/氵  =  冰
 ⢃⠤⡚ -  か/金 + 宿 + ぬ/力  =  劉
 ⠷⠤⠼ -  れ/口 + 宿 + ろ/十  =  叶
 ⢗⠤⠾ -  け/犬 + 宿 + れ/口  =  吠
 ⠷⠤⠮ -  れ/口 + 宿 + り/分  =  吩
 ⠷⠤⢎ -  れ/口 + 宿 + き/木  =  呆
 ⠷⠤⢪ -  れ/口 + 宿 + さ/阝  =  咋
 ⠷⠤⡌ -  れ/口 + 宿 + ゐ/幺  =  咳
 ⠷⠤⣘ -  れ/口 + 宿 + ゆ/彳  =  哘
 ⠷⠤⢞ -  れ/口 + 宿 + け/犬  =  哭
 ⡳⠤⡺ -  つ/土 + 宿 + つ/土  =  圭
 ⡳⠤⣘ -  つ/土 + 宿 + ゆ/彳  =  垳
 ⢗⠤⠼ -  け/犬 + 宿 + ろ/十  =  夲
 ⢗⠤⡺ -  け/犬 + 宿 + つ/土  =  奎
 ⣓⠤⢞ -  ふ/女 + 宿 + け/犬  =  妖
 ⣗⠤⣚ -  へ/⺩ + 宿 + ふ/女  =  妝
 ⣓⠤⣪ -  ふ/女 + 宿 + ま/石  =  妬
 ⢵⠤⣚ -  そ/馬 + 宿 + ふ/女  =  姜
 ⣓⠤⡺ -  ふ/女 + 宿 + つ/土  =  娃
 ⡵⠤⡨ -  と/戸 + 宿 + を/貝  =  屓
 ⡑⠤⢊ -  や/疒 + 宿 + か/金  =  崟
 ⡱⠤⢼ -  よ/广 + 宿 + そ/馬  =  庠
 ⣑⠤⣮ -  ゆ/彳 + 宿 + み/耳  =  弭
 ⣑⠤⣜ -  ゆ/彳 + 宿 + ほ/方  =  彷
 ⣑⠤⣨ -  ゆ/彳 + 宿 + ん/止  =  徙
 ⠧⠤⢬ -  り/分 + 宿 + 心  =  忿
 ⠳⠤⡚ -  る/忄 + 宿 + ぬ/力  =  恊
 ⡳⠤⢬ -  つ/土 + 宿 + 心  =  恚
 ⡵⠤⣞ -  と/戸 + 宿 + へ/⺩  =  扁
 ⡷⠤⠮ -  て/扌 + 宿 + り/分  =  扮
 ⡷⠤⡺ -  て/扌 + 宿 + つ/土  =  挂
 ⡷⠤⣼ -  て/扌 + 宿 + も/門  =  捫
 ⡷⠤⢼ -  て/扌 + 宿 + そ/馬  =  掾
 ⣵⠤⢸ -  も/門 + 宿 + 氷/氵  =  攷
 ⣣⠤⡨ -  ま/石 + 宿 + を/貝  =  斫
 ⢇⠤⡨ -  き/木 + 宿 + を/貝  =  斯
 ⣅⠤⣈ -  日 + 宿 + 龸  =  晄
 ⢇⠤⡼ -  き/木 + 宿 + と/戸  =  朴
 ⢇⠤⢊ -  き/木 + 宿 + か/金  =  杆
 ⢥⠤⢜ -  心 + 宿 + こ/子  =  李
 ⢇⠤⢜ -  き/木 + 宿 + こ/子  =  杠
 ⣅⠤⢎ -  日 + 宿 + き/木  =  杲
 ⢥⠤⣜ -  心 + 宿 + ほ/方  =  枋
 ⢥⠤⢪ -  心 + 宿 + さ/阝  =  柞
 ⢇⠤⣞ -  き/木 + 宿 + へ/⺩  =  柵
 ⢥⠤⡺ -  心 + 宿 + つ/土  =  桂
 ⢥⠤⠎ -  心 + 宿 + い/糹/#  =  椎
 ⣕⠤⢞ -  ほ/方 + 宿 + け/犬  =  殀
 ⡇⠤⢪ -  に/氵 + 宿 + さ/阝  =  氾
 ⡇⠤⠼ -  に/氵 + 宿 + ろ/十  =  汁
 ⢱⠤⡺ -  氷/氵 + 宿 + つ/土  =  汢
 ⢱⠤⣌ -  氷/氵 + 宿 + 日  =  汨
 ⡇⠤⠮ -  に/氵 + 宿 + り/分  =  汾
 ⡇⠤⢬ -  に/氵 + 宿 + 心  =  沁
 ⡇⠤⢞ -  に/氵 + 宿 + け/犬  =  沃
 ⡇⠤⢎ -  に/氵 + 宿 + き/木  =  沐
 ⡇⠤⢮ -  に/氵 + 宿 + し/巿  =  沛
 ⡇⠤⡪ -  に/氵 + 宿 + た/⽥  =  沺
 ⡇⠤⣾ -  に/氵 + 宿 + め/目  =  泪
 ⡇⠤⡎ -  に/氵 + 宿 + に/氵  =  洒
 ⢱⠤⢊ -  氷/氵 + 宿 + か/金  =  淦
 ⡇⠤⠺ -  に/氵 + 宿 + る/忄  =  淪
 ⡇⠤⠎ -  に/氵 + 宿 + い/糹/#  =  淮
 ⡇⠤⢊ -  に/氵 + 宿 + か/金  =  渦
 ⢱⠤⡚ -  氷/氵 + 宿 + ぬ/力  =  滔
 ⣱⠤⢪ -  火 + 宿 + さ/阝  =  炸
 ⣱⠤⢼ -  火 + 宿 + そ/馬  =  燹
 ⢗⠤⣸ -  け/犬 + 宿 + 火  =  狄
 ⢗⠤⡨ -  け/犬 + 宿 + を/貝  =  狽
 ⣗⠤⣮ -  へ/⺩ + 宿 + み/耳  =  珥
 ⣗⠤⡺ -  へ/⺩ + 宿 + つ/土  =  珪
 ⣗⠤⠸ -  へ/⺩ + 宿 + 比  =  琵
 ⣗⠤⣎ -  へ/⺩ + 宿 + ひ/辶  =  琶
 ⣗⠤⢼ -  へ/⺩ + 宿 + そ/馬  =  瑪
 ⣗⠤⢊ -  へ/⺩ + 宿 + か/金  =  瑶
 ⡣⠤⢸ -  た/⽥ + 宿 + 氷/氵  =  畋
 ⡣⠤⠚ -  た/⽥ + 宿 + う/宀/#  =  畛
 ⡑⠤⢘ -  や/疒 + 宿 + 仁/亻  =  疣
 ⡑⠤⠚ -  や/疒 + 宿 + う/宀/#  =  疹
 ⡑⠤⢼ -  や/疒 + 宿 + そ/馬  =  疽
 ⡑⠤⡘ -  や/疒 + 宿 + や/疒  =  痕
 ⢃⠤⢌ -  か/金 + 宿 + ⺼  =  盂
 ⢵⠤⠪ -  そ/馬 + 宿 + ら/月  =  盖
 ⣷⠤⣼ -  め/目 + 宿 + も/門  =  盻
 ⣷⠤⠸ -  め/目 + 宿 + 比  =  眥
 ⣷⠤⢞ -  め/目 + 宿 + け/犬  =  眷
 ⣷⠤⢚ -  め/目 + 宿 + く/艹  =  瞿
 ⣣⠤⠸ -  ま/石 + 宿 + 比  =  砒
 ⣣⠤⡺ -  ま/石 + 宿 + つ/土  =  硅
 ⢇⠤⣪ -  き/木 + 宿 + ま/石  =  碁
 ⣣⠤⠎ -  ま/石 + 宿 + い/糹/#  =  碓
 ⡗⠤⢎ -  ね/示 + 宿 + き/木  =  祀
 ⡗⠤⣨ -  ね/示 + 宿 + ん/止  =  祗
 ⡗⠤⢪ -  ね/示 + 宿 + さ/阝  =  祚
 ⡕⠤⣈ -  の/禾 + 宿 + 龸  =  禿
 ⡕⠤⠸ -  の/禾 + 宿 + 比  =  秕
 ⠓⠤⢪ -  う/宀/# + 宿 + さ/阝  =  窄
 ⣣⠤⠼ -  ま/石 + 宿 + ろ/十  =  竍
 ⣣⠤⢾ -  ま/石 + 宿 + せ/食  =  竓
 ⣣⠤⠮ -  ま/石 + 宿 + り/分  =  竕
 ⣣⠤⡼ -  ま/石 + 宿 + と/戸  =  站
 ⡧⠤⠎ -  ち/竹 + 宿 + い/糹/#  =  竺
 ⡧⠤⡼ -  ち/竹 + 宿 + と/戸  =  笄
 ⡕⠤⠼ -  の/禾 + 宿 + ろ/十  =  籵
 ⠇⠤⡨ -  い/糹/# + 宿 + を/貝  =  糺
 ⠇⠤⠸ -  い/糹/# + 宿 + 比  =  紕
 ⠇⠤⠞ -  い/糹/# + 宿 + え/訁  =  紜
 ⠇⠤⣘ -  い/糹/# + 宿 + ゆ/彳  =  絎
 ⠇⠤⠺ -  い/糹/# + 宿 + る/忄  =  綸
 ⢵⠤⣨ -  そ/馬 + 宿 + ん/止  =  羝
 ⢵⠤⢼ -  そ/馬 + 宿 + そ/馬  =  羞
 ⢕⠤⣎ -  こ/子 + 宿 + ひ/辶  =  耙
 ⢕⠤⠪ -  こ/子 + 宿 + ら/月  =  耜
 ⣧⠤⣨ -  み/耳 + 宿 + ん/止  =  耻
 ⣧⠤⢪ -  み/耳 + 宿 + さ/阝  =  聊
 ⢅⠤⡺ -  ⺼ + 宿 + つ/土  =  肚
 ⢅⠤⢪ -  ⺼ + 宿 + さ/阝  =  胙
 ⢅⠤⡸ -  ⺼ + 宿 + よ/广  =  胥
 ⢅⠤⡼ -  ⺼ + 宿 + と/戸  =  胼
 ⢅⠤⠮ -  ⺼ + 宿 + り/分  =  臉
 ⣗⠤⢺ -  へ/⺩ + 宿 + す/発  =  臧
 ⡓⠤⡼ -  ぬ/力 + 宿 + と/戸  =  舁
 ⣓⠤⣜ -  ふ/女 + 宿 + ほ/方  =  舫
 ⣓⠤⡼ -  ふ/女 + 宿 + と/戸  =  舮
 ⢥⠤⡼ -  心 + 宿 + と/戸  =  芦
 ⢓⠤⠮ -  く/艹 + 宿 + り/分  =  芬
 ⢥⠤⣎ -  心 + 宿 + ひ/辶  =  芭
 ⢓⠤⢬ -  く/艹 + 宿 + 心  =  芯
 ⢓⠤⢞ -  く/艹 + 宿 + け/犬  =  萼
 ⢥⠤⡞ -  心 + 宿 + ね/示  =  蒜
 ⣳⠤⣾ -  む/車 + 宿 + め/目  =  蠅
 ⣳⠤⢼ -  む/車 + 宿 + そ/馬  =  蠡
 ⣳⠤⢌ -  む/車 + 宿 + ⺼  =  蠱
 ⣑⠤⣘ -  ゆ/彳 + 宿 + ゆ/彳  =  衍
 ⡗⠤⠚ -  ね/示 + 宿 + う/宀/#  =  衫
 ⡗⠤⣌ -  ね/示 + 宿 + 日  =  衵
 ⡗⠤⡾ -  ね/示 + 宿 + て/扌  =  袂
 ⡗⠤⡺ -  ね/示 + 宿 + つ/土  =  袿
 ⡗⠤⣘ -  ね/示 + 宿 + ゆ/彳  =  裄
 ⡗⠤⠾ -  ね/示 + 宿 + れ/口  =  褝
 ⠗⠤⢊ -  え/訁 + 宿 + か/金  =  訐
 ⠗⠤⣎ -  え/訁 + 宿 + ひ/辶  =  詑
 ⠗⠤⡺ -  え/訁 + 宿 + つ/土  =  誦
 ⠗⠤⡚ -  え/訁 + 宿 + ぬ/力  =  諂
 ⢵⠤⠸ -  そ/馬 + 宿 + 比  =  豼
 ⡡⠤⣬ -  を/貝 + 宿 + 囗  =  賤
 ⡡⠤⡨ -  を/貝 + 宿 + を/貝  =  贔
 ⣃⠤⠚ -  は/辶 + 宿 + う/宀/#  =  趁
 ⣧⠤⣪ -  み/耳 + 宿 + ま/石  =  跖
 ⣧⠤⣞ -  み/耳 + 宿 + へ/⺩  =  跚
 ⣧⠤⡚ -  み/耳 + 宿 + ぬ/力  =  蹈
 ⣳⠤⡨ -  む/車 + 宿 + を/貝  =  軋
 ⣳⠤⣘ -  む/車 + 宿 + ゆ/彳  =  輊
 ⣳⠤⣜ -  む/車 + 宿 + ほ/方  =  輔
 ⣃⠤⢊ -  は/辶 + 宿 + か/金  =  迂
 ⣇⠤⡼ -  ひ/辶 + 宿 + と/戸  =  迸
 ⣇⠤⠞ -  ひ/辶 + 宿 + え/訁  =  迹
 ⡃⠤⢪ -  な/亻 + 宿 + さ/阝  =  那
 ⢣⠤⢞ -  さ/阝 + 宿 + け/犬  =  鄂
 ⢣⠤⣼ -  さ/阝 + 宿 + も/門  =  鄒
 ⢃⠤⡮ -  か/金 + 宿 + ち/竹  =  釡
 ⢃⠤⠾ -  か/金 + 宿 + れ/口  =  釦
 ⢃⠤⣼ -  か/金 + 宿 + も/門  =  鈞
 ⢃⠤⡼ -  か/金 + 宿 + と/戸  =  鈩
 ⢃⠤⣎ -  か/金 + 宿 + ひ/辶  =  鉈
 ⢃⠤⢪ -  か/金 + 宿 + さ/阝  =  鉚
 ⢃⠤⣜ -  か/金 + 宿 + ほ/方  =  鋪
 ⢃⠤⢞ -  か/金 + 宿 + け/犬  =  鍔
 ⢃⠤⠬ -  か/金 + 宿 + 宿  =  鏥
 ⣵⠤⡎ -  も/門 + 宿 + に/氵  =  閖
 ⣵⠤⢜ -  も/門 + 宿 + こ/子  =  閘
 ⣵⠤⡚ -  も/門 + 宿 + ぬ/力  =  閻
 ⣵⠤⣎ -  も/門 + 宿 + ひ/辶  =  闌
 ⣵⠤⢼ -  も/門 + 宿 + そ/馬  =  闖
 ⢣⠤⣨ -  さ/阝 + 宿 + ん/止  =  阯
 ⢣⠤⣎ -  さ/阝 + 宿 + ひ/辶  =  陀
 ⠇⠤⠼ -  い/糹/# + 宿 + ろ/十  =  隼
 ⡑⠤⢾ -  や/疒 + 宿 + せ/食  =  雉
 ⣷⠤⠎ -  め/目 + 宿 + い/糹/#  =  雎
 ⡵⠤⡺ -  と/戸 + 宿 + つ/土  =  鞋
 ⠕⠤⢺ -  お/頁 + 宿 + す/発  =  頤
 ⠕⠤⣮ -  お/頁 + 宿 + み/耳  =  顳
 ⢷⠤⡮ -  せ/食 + 宿 + ち/竹  =  餃
 ⢷⠤⡚ -  せ/食 + 宿 + ぬ/力  =  餡
 ⢷⠤⣸ -  せ/食 + 宿 + 火  =  餤
 ⢵⠤⡬ -  そ/馬 + 宿 + ゑ/訁  =  馭
 ⢵⠤⣎ -  そ/馬 + 宿 + ひ/辶  =  駝
 ⢷⠤⣜ -  せ/食 + 宿 + ほ/方  =  魴
 ⢷⠤⢪ -  せ/食 + 宿 + さ/阝  =  鮓
 ⡷⠤⢾ -  て/扌 + 宿 + せ/食  =  鴃
 ⢱⠤⢾ -  氷/氵 + 宿 + せ/食  =  鴆
 ⣷⠤⢾ -  め/目 + 宿 + せ/食  =  鴉
 ⠵⠤⢾ -  ろ/十 + 宿 + せ/食  =  鴒
 ⣡⠤⢾ -  ん/止 + 宿 + せ/食  =  鴟
 ⠕⠤⢾ -  お/頁 + 宿 + せ/食  =  鴦
 ⠓⠤⢾ -  う/宀/# + 宿 + せ/食  =  鴪
 ⡣⠤⢾ -  た/⽥ + 宿 + せ/食  =  鴫
 ⡧⠤⢾ -  ち/竹 + 宿 + せ/食  =  鵁
 ⠇⠤⢾ -  い/糹/# + 宿 + せ/食  =  鷦
 ⢧⠤⣜ -  し/巿 + 宿 + ほ/方  =  黼
 ⡕⠤⣾ -  の/禾 + 宿 + め/目  =  龝
 ⢓⠤⢨ -  く/艹 + 宿 + 数  =  薮
 ⢃⠤⣮ -  か/金 + 宿 + み/耳  =  鑷
 ⣣⠤⣪ -  ま/石 + 宿 + ま/石  =  碚
 ⡃⠤⣊ -  な/亻 + 宿 + は/辶  =  伎
 ⢑⠤⡺ -  仁/亻 + 宿 + つ/土  =  俑
 ⡃⠤⢸ -  な/亻 + 宿 + 氷/氵  =  偈
 ⡃⠤⣘ -  な/亻 + 宿 + ゆ/彳  =  偸
 ⡃⠤⡾ -  な/亻 + 宿 + て/扌  =  傅
 ⣥⠤⠞ -  囗 + 宿 + え/訁  =  冏
 ⣅⠤⣾ -  日 + 宿 + め/目  =  冐
 ⢱⠤⣾ -  氷/氵 + 宿 + め/目  =  冴
 ⡓⠤⡾ -  ぬ/力 + 宿 + て/扌  =  刔
 ⡓⠤⢜ -  ぬ/力 + 宿 + こ/子  =  刧
 ⡓⠤⣞ -  ぬ/力 + 宿 + へ/⺩  =  刪
 ⡓⠤⡘ -  ぬ/力 + 宿 + や/疒  =  剴
 ⢗⠤⡚ -  け/犬 + 宿 + ぬ/力  =  勁
 ⡵⠤⡚ -  と/戸 + 宿 + ぬ/力  =  勒
 ⡳⠤⡼ -  つ/土 + 宿 + と/戸  =  卦
 ⡱⠤⢪ -  よ/广 + 宿 + さ/阝  =  卮
 ⢣⠤⡪ -  さ/阝 + 宿 + た/⽥  =  卻
 ⠷⠤⠎ -  れ/口 + 宿 + い/糹/#  =  售
 ⠷⠤⡚ -  れ/口 + 宿 + ぬ/力  =  啗
 ⠷⠤⢸ -  れ/口 + 宿 + 氷/氵  =  喝
 ⠷⠤⢼ -  れ/口 + 宿 + そ/馬  =  噌
 ⠷⠤⢾ -  れ/口 + 宿 + せ/食  =  嚥
 ⣥⠤⣜ -  囗 + 宿 + ほ/方  =  圃
 ⣥⠤⠎ -  囗 + 宿 + い/糹/#  =  圍
 ⣥⠤⠺ -  囗 + 宿 + る/忄  =  圜
 ⡳⠤⡘ -  つ/土 + 宿 + や/疒  =  垠
 ⡳⠤⣜ -  つ/土 + 宿 + ほ/方  =  埔
 ⡳⠤⢊ -  つ/土 + 宿 + か/金  =  堝
 ⡳⠤⣌ -  つ/土 + 宿 + 日  =  堵
 ⢗⠤⡼ -  け/犬 + 宿 + と/戸  =  套
 ⣓⠤⢼ -  ふ/女 + 宿 + そ/馬  =  媽
 ⣓⠤⣺ -  ふ/女 + 宿 + む/車  =  媾
 ⡵⠤⢜ -  と/戸 + 宿 + こ/子  =  孱
 ⢗⠤⠚ -  け/犬 + 宿 + う/宀/#  =  尨
 ⡵⠤⡼ -  と/戸 + 宿 + と/戸  =  屏
 ⡑⠤⣬ -  や/疒 + 宿 + 囗  =  峩
 ⡱⠤⣎ -  よ/广 + 宿 + ひ/辶  =  巵
 ⢧⠤⡼ -  し/巿 + 宿 + と/戸  =  帖
 ⢧⠤⠎ -  し/巿 + 宿 + い/糹/#  =  幃
 ⣑⠤⣺ -  ゆ/彳 + 宿 + む/車  =  弘
 ⣑⠤⣈ -  ゆ/彳 + 宿 + 龸  =  弥
 ⣑⠤⡪ -  ゆ/彳 + 宿 + た/⽥  =  彊
 ⢗⠤⢺ -  け/犬 + 宿 + す/発  =  彗
 ⣑⠤⣾ -  ゆ/彳 + 宿 + め/目  =  彿
 ⣑⠤⡘ -  ゆ/彳 + 宿 + や/疒  =  很
 ⠳⠤⣾ -  る/忄 + 宿 + め/目  =  怫
 ⡧⠤⢬ -  ち/竹 + 宿 + 心  =  悉
 ⠳⠤⢺ -  る/忄 + 宿 + す/発  =  愎
 ⠳⠤⡾ -  る/忄 + 宿 + て/扌  =  慱
 ⠕⠤⣬ -  お/頁 + 宿 + 囗  =  戛
 ⣵⠤⣬ -  も/門 + 宿 + 囗  =  戡
 ⡷⠤⢘ -  て/扌 + 宿 + 仁/亻  =  托
 ⡷⠤⢊ -  て/扌 + 宿 + か/金  =  扞
 ⡷⠤⡪ -  て/扌 + 宿 + た/⽥  =  扣
 ⡷⠤⡾ -  て/扌 + 宿 + て/扌  =  抉
 ⡷⠤⣎ -  て/扌 + 宿 + ひ/辶  =  把
 ⡷⠤⡊ -  て/扌 + 宿 + な/亻  =  挟
 ⡷⠤⠼ -  て/扌 + 宿 + ろ/十  =  撩
 ⡷⠤⢜ -  て/扌 + 宿 + こ/子  =  撰
 ⡷⠤⢎ -  て/扌 + 宿 + き/木  =  擒
 ⡷⠤⡘ -  て/扌 + 宿 + や/疒  =  擢
 ⣅⠤⡸ -  日 + 宿 + よ/广  =  昿
 ⢇⠤⣬ -  き/木 + 宿 + 囗  =  桟
 ⢇⠤⡺ -  き/木 + 宿 + つ/土  =  桶
 ⢇⠤⢾ -  き/木 + 宿 + せ/食  =  梟
 ⢇⠤⣺ -  き/木 + 宿 + む/車  =  梭
 ⢇⠤⠺ -  き/木 + 宿 + る/忄  =  棆
 ⢥⠤⣾ -  心 + 宿 + め/目  =  棉
 ⢇⠤⢎ -  き/木 + 宿 + き/木  =  棋
 ⢇⠤⠪ -  き/木 + 宿 + ら/月  =  楕
 ⢥⠤⢎ -  心 + 宿 + き/木  =  槿
 ⢥⠤⡪ -  心 + 宿 + た/⽥  =  橿
 ⢇⠤⡘ -  き/木 + 宿 + や/疒  =  櫂
 ⣕⠤⠚ -  ほ/方 + 宿 + う/宀/#  =  殄
 ⣕⠤⣪ -  ほ/方 + 宿 + ま/石  =  殕
 ⡇⠤⡊ -  に/氵 + 宿 + な/亻  =  浹
 ⡇⠤⡚ -  に/氵 + 宿 + ぬ/力  =  淵
 ⡇⠤⡸ -  に/氵 + 宿 + よ/广  =  渫
 ⡇⠤⢘ -  に/氵 + 宿 + 仁/亻  =  湲
 ⡇⠤⢺ -  に/氵 + 宿 + す/発  =  溌
 ⡇⠤⠞ -  に/氵 + 宿 + え/訁  =  溲
 ⡇⠤⣈ -  に/氵 + 宿 + 龸  =  滾
 ⣱⠤⣬ -  火 + 宿 + 囗  =  炯
 ⣱⠤⣜ -  火 + 宿 + ほ/方  =  烽
 ⣱⠤⡚ -  火 + 宿 + ぬ/力  =  焔
 ⣱⠤⢘ -  火 + 宿 + 仁/亻  =  煖
 ⢓⠤⣸ -  く/艹 + 宿 + 火  =  熏
 ⣱⠤⡘ -  火 + 宿 + や/疒  =  燿
 ⣗⠤⣬ -  へ/⺩ + 宿 + 囗  =  牋
 ⣗⠤⡸ -  へ/⺩ + 宿 + よ/广  =  牒
 ⢵⠤⣾ -  そ/馬 + 宿 + め/目  =  牝
 ⢵⠤⠜ -  そ/馬 + 宿 + お/頁  =  牡
 ⢗⠤⢘ -  け/犬 + 宿 + 仁/亻  =  犹
 ⢗⠤⣾ -  け/犬 + 宿 + め/目  =  狒
 ⣗⠤⣞ -  へ/⺩ + 宿 + へ/⺩  =  珊
 ⣗⠤⣈ -  へ/⺩ + 宿 + 龸  =  珎
 ⣗⠤⡜ -  へ/⺩ + 宿 + の/禾  =  瑕
 ⣗⠤⡮ -  へ/⺩ + 宿 + ち/竹  =  瑙
 ⣗⠤⡨ -  へ/⺩ + 宿 + を/貝  =  瑣
 ⣗⠤⢎ -  へ/⺩ + 宿 + き/木  =  瑾
 ⣗⠤⡊ -  へ/⺩ + 宿 + な/亻  =  璞
 ⣵⠤⡪ -  も/門 + 宿 + た/⽥  =  甸
 ⢗⠤⡪ -  け/犬 + 宿 + た/⽥  =  畚
 ⡣⠤⣞ -  た/⽥ + 宿 + へ/⺩  =  畴
 ⡑⠤⢺ -  や/疒 + 宿 + す/発  =  癈
 ⡳⠤⢌ -  つ/土 + 宿 + ⺼  =  盍
 ⣥⠤⢌ -  囗 + 宿 + ⺼  =  盞
 ⣣⠤⢸ -  ま/石 + 宿 + 氷/氵  =  碣
 ⣣⠤⡮ -  ま/石 + 宿 + ち/竹  =  碯
 ⣑⠤⡜ -  ゆ/彳 + 宿 + の/禾  =  粥
 ⠇⠤⣬ -  い/糹/# + 宿 + 囗  =  絨
 ⡅⠤⢜ -  ゐ/幺 + 宿 + こ/子  =  絳
 ⠇⠤⡼ -  い/糹/# + 宿 + と/戸  =  綯
 ⠇⠤⡮ -  い/糹/# + 宿 + ち/竹  =  綵
 ⠇⠤⢺ -  い/糹/# + 宿 + す/発  =  綾
 ⠇⠤⡸ -  い/糹/# + 宿 + よ/广  =  緤
 ⡅⠤⠼ -  ゐ/幺 + 宿 + ろ/十  =  繚
 ⠇⠤⢪ -  い/糹/# + 宿 + さ/阝  =  纃
 ⢅⠤⡾ -  ⺼ + 宿 + て/扌  =  膊
 ⢓⠤⠪ -  く/艹 + 宿 + ら/月  =  臈
 ⣓⠤⠞ -  ふ/女 + 宿 + え/訁  =  艘
 ⣓⠤⣌ -  ふ/女 + 宿 + 日  =  艪
 ⢓⠤⡘ -  く/艹 + 宿 + や/疒  =  艱
 ⢓⠤⠚ -  く/艹 + 宿 + う/宀/#  =  苑
 ⢓⠤⡊ -  く/艹 + 宿 + な/亻  =  莢
 ⢥⠤⣪ -  心 + 宿 + ま/石  =  菩
 ⢥⠤⢊ -  心 + 宿 + か/金  =  萵
 ⢥⠤⣘ -  心 + 宿 + ゆ/彳  =  萸
 ⣳⠤⢸ -  む/車 + 宿 + 氷/氵  =  蝎
 ⣳⠤⡜ -  む/車 + 宿 + の/禾  =  蝦
 ⣳⠤⢨ -  む/車 + 宿 + 数  =  蝪
 ⣳⠤⢺ -  む/車 + 宿 + す/発  =  蝮
 ⣳⠤⢊ -  む/車 + 宿 + か/金  =  蝸
 ⣥⠤⢜ -  囗 + 宿 + こ/子  =  觚
 ⠗⠤⠎ -  え/訁 + 宿 + い/糹/#  =  諱
 ⠗⠤⢚ -  え/訁 + 宿 + く/艹  =  謨
 ⣃⠤⢪ -  は/辶 + 宿 + さ/阝  =  赳
 ⣧⠤⣘ -  み/耳 + 宿 + ゆ/彳  =  踰
 ⣧⠤⣾ -  み/耳 + 宿 + め/目  =  蹣
 ⣧⠤⡊ -  み/耳 + 宿 + な/亻  =  蹼
 ⣳⠤⠞ -  む/車 + 宿 + え/訁  =  轅
 ⣇⠤⢞ -  ひ/辶 + 宿 + け/犬  =  逕
 ⣇⠤⣘ -  ひ/辶 + 宿 + ゆ/彳  =  逾
 ⣇⠤⢸ -  ひ/辶 + 宿 + 氷/氵  =  遏
 ⣇⠤⡜ -  ひ/辶 + 宿 + の/禾  =  遐
 ⣇⠤⢊ -  ひ/辶 + 宿 + か/金  =  遥
 ⣇⠤⠼ -  ひ/辶 + 宿 + ろ/十  =  遼
 ⣇⠤⣬ -  ひ/辶 + 宿 + 囗  =  邇
 ⢷⠤⡜ -  せ/食 + 宿 + の/禾  =  酘
 ⢷⠤⡌ -  せ/食 + 宿 + ゐ/幺  =  酳
 ⢷⠤⢺ -  せ/食 + 宿 + す/発  =  醗
 ⢃⠤⡊ -  か/金 + 宿 + な/亻  =  鋏
 ⢃⠤⢊ -  か/金 + 宿 + か/金  =  鍋
 ⢃⠤⣘ -  か/金 + 宿 + ゆ/彳  =  鍮
 ⢃⠤⡘ -  か/金 + 宿 + や/疒  =  鎧
 ⢣⠤⡊ -  さ/阝 + 宿 + な/亻  =  陜
 ⢣⠤⠪ -  さ/阝 + 宿 + ら/月  =  隋
 ⡵⠤⢸ -  と/戸 + 宿 + 氷/氵  =  鞨
 ⡵⠤⣎ -  と/戸 + 宿 + ひ/辶  =  鞴
 ⠵⠤⠎ -  ろ/十 + 宿 + い/糹/#  =  韓
 ⠇⠤⡚ -  い/糹/# + 宿 + ぬ/力  =  韜
 ⣣⠤⣼ -  ま/石 + 宿 + も/門  =  韵
 ⠕⠤⢞ -  お/頁 + 宿 + け/犬  =  顴
 ⡓⠤⢾ -  ぬ/力 + 宿 + せ/食  =  飭
 ⢷⠤⣬ -  せ/食 + 宿 + 囗  =  餞
 ⢷⠤⢜ -  せ/食 + 宿 + こ/子  =  饌
 ⢵⠤⠎ -  そ/馬 + 宿 + い/糹/#  =  騅
 ⠕⠤⡼ -  お/頁 + 宿 + と/戸  =  魁
 ⢷⠤⡸ -  せ/食 + 宿 + よ/广  =  鰈
 ⣳⠤⢾ -  む/車 + 宿 + せ/食  =  鳳
 ⡵⠤⢾ -  と/戸 + 宿 + せ/食  =  鳶
 ⣓⠤⢾ -  ふ/女 + 宿 + せ/食  =  鵐
 ⠣⠤⢾ -  ら/月 + 宿 + せ/食  =  鵑
 ⣇⠤⢾ -  ひ/辶 + 宿 + せ/食  =  鶸
 ⢑⠤⢾ -  仁/亻 + 宿 + せ/食  =  鶺
 ⢃⠤⢾ -  か/金 + 宿 + せ/食  =  鶻
 ⢗⠤⢾ -  け/犬 + 宿 + せ/食  =  鸛
 ⣡⠤⠮ -  ん/止 + 宿 + り/分  =  鹸
 ⢕⠤⢼ -  こ/子 + 宿 + そ/馬  =  麑
 ⢇⠤⢼ -  き/木 + 宿 + そ/馬  =  麒
 ⡕⠤⢼ -  の/禾 + 宿 + そ/馬  =  麟
 ⢳⠤⢞ -  す/発 + 宿 + け/犬  =  麩
 ⢇⣲⠬ -  き/木 + む/車 + 宿  =  凩
 ⡓⡴⠬ -  ぬ/力 + と/戸 + 宿  =  剳
 ⡷⡴⠬ -  て/扌 + と/戸 + 宿  =  搭

Other compounds

 ⣑⠬ -  ゆ/彳 + 宿  =  弟
 ⣑⠤⢾ -  ゆ/彳 + 宿 + せ/食  =  鵜
 ⡃⣐⠬ -  な/亻 + ゆ/彳 + 宿  =  俤
 ⡓⣐⠬ -  ぬ/力 + ゆ/彳 + 宿  =  剃
 ⠳⣐⠬ -  る/忄 + ゆ/彳 + 宿  =  悌
 ⢇⣐⠬ -  き/木 + ゆ/彳 + 宿  =  梯
 ⡇⣐⠬ -  に/氵 + ゆ/彳 + 宿  =  涕
 ⣷⣐⠬ -  め/目 + ゆ/彳 + 宿  =  睇
 ⣱⠬ -  火 + 宿  =  蛍
 ⣱⣰⠬ -  火 + 火 + 宿  =  螢
 ⡵⠬ -  と/戸 + 宿  =  髯
 ⠥⡎ -  宿 + に/氵  =  垂
 ⠷⠤⡎ -  れ/口 + 宿 + に/氵  =  唾
 ⠥⠤⡎ -  宿 + 宿 + に/氵  =  埀
 ⡷⠤⡎ -  て/扌 + 宿 + に/氵  =  捶
 ⢣⠤⡎ -  さ/阝 + 宿 + に/氵  =  陲
 ⡃⠤⠚ -  な/亻 + 宿 + う/宀/#  =  俘
 ⡵⠤⢘ -  と/戸 + 宿 + 仁/亻  =  丱
 ⠥⠤⣈ -  宿 + 宿 + 龸  =  亅
 ⢑⠤⣚ -  仁/亻 + 宿 + ふ/女  =  佞
 ⡃⠤⡊ -  な/亻 + 宿 + な/亻  =  侠
 ⡃⠤⢜ -  な/亻 + 宿 + こ/子  =  偬
 ⢑⠤⢸ -  仁/亻 + 宿 + 氷/氵  =  傚
 ⡃⠤⣜ -  な/亻 + 宿 + ほ/方  =  傲
 ⢑⠤⢪ -  仁/亻 + 宿 + さ/阝  =  僊
 ⡃⠤⡪ -  な/亻 + 宿 + た/⽥  =  僵
 ⡃⠤⣪ -  な/亻 + 宿 + ま/石  =  僻
 ⡃⠤⠎ -  な/亻 + 宿 + い/糹/#  =  儁
 ⢱⠤⢺ -  氷/氵 + 宿 + す/発  =  凌
 ⢗⠤⡞ -  け/犬 + 宿 + ね/示  =  剄
 ⡓⠤⣪ -  ぬ/力 + 宿 + ま/石  =  劈
 ⣅⠤⣎ -  日 + 宿 + ひ/辶  =  匙
 ⢣⠤⢪ -  さ/阝 + 宿 + さ/阝  =  卿
 ⡱⠤⠚ -  よ/广 + 宿 + う/宀/#  =  厖
 ⡱⠤⢘ -  よ/广 + 宿 + 仁/亻  =  厩
 ⡱⠤⢎ -  よ/广 + 宿 + き/木  =  厮
 ⡱⠤⢸ -  よ/广 + 宿 + 氷/氵  =  厰
 ⠷⠤⢺ -  れ/口 + 宿 + す/発  =  咎
 ⠷⠤⣨ -  れ/口 + 宿 + ん/止  =  唄
 ⠷⠤⡺ -  れ/口 + 宿 + つ/土  =  啀
 ⠷⠤⡜ -  れ/口 + 宿 + の/禾  =  喘
 ⠷⠤⣜ -  れ/口 + 宿 + ほ/方  =  嗷
 ⣥⠤⣨ -  囗 + 宿 + ん/止  =  嗽
 ⣁⠤⡎ -  龸 + 宿 + に/氵  =  嘗
 ⠷⠤⡨ -  れ/口 + 宿 + を/貝  =  嘶
 ⠷⠤⠚ -  れ/口 + 宿 + う/宀/#  =  噪
 ⠷⠤⢊ -  れ/口 + 宿 + か/金  =  嚠
 ⠷⠤⠜ -  れ/口 + 宿 + お/頁  =  囂
 ⡳⠤⠾ -  つ/土 + 宿 + れ/口  =  垢
 ⡳⠤⣼ -  つ/土 + 宿 + も/門  =  堰
 ⡳⠤⣞ -  つ/土 + 宿 + へ/⺩  =  塀
 ⡳⠤⡸ -  つ/土 + 宿 + よ/广  =  壥
 ⣓⠤⢪ -  ふ/女 + 宿 + さ/阝  =  娜
 ⣓⠤⠪ -  ふ/女 + 宿 + ら/月  =  娟
 ⣓⠤⣨ -  ふ/女 + 宿 + ん/止  =  嫩
 ⣓⠤⡜ -  ふ/女 + 宿 + の/禾  =  嬌
 ⡣⠤⣚ -  た/⽥ + 宿 + ふ/女  =  嬲
 ⣓⠤⣮ -  ふ/女 + 宿 + み/耳  =  孅
 ⢕⠤⡌ -  こ/子 + 宿 + ゐ/幺  =  孳
 ⡵⠤⣊ -  と/戸 + 宿 + は/辶  =  屐
 ⡑⠤⣜ -  や/疒 + 宿 + ほ/方  =  峯
 ⢃⠤⠊ -  か/金 + 宿 + selector 1  =  巛
 ⡱⠤⡚ -  よ/广 + 宿 + ぬ/力  =  廁
 ⡱⠤⢺ -  よ/广 + 宿 + す/発  =  廈
 ⡱⠤⡜ -  よ/广 + 宿 + の/禾  =  廏
 ⡱⠤⡼ -  よ/广 + 宿 + と/戸  =  廚
 ⡱⠤⡪ -  よ/广 + 宿 + た/⽥  =  廬
 ⣑⠤⢸ -  ゆ/彳 + 宿 + 氷/氵  =  徼
 ⣑⠤⡌ -  ゆ/彳 + 宿 + ゐ/幺  =  徽
 ⠳⠤⠜ -  る/忄 + 宿 + お/頁  =  忰
 ⣓⠤⢬ -  ふ/女 + 宿 + 心  =  恕
 ⠳⠤⣼ -  る/忄 + 宿 + も/門  =  恟
 ⠳⠤⠪ -  る/忄 + 宿 + ら/月  =  悁
 ⠳⠤⡜ -  る/忄 + 宿 + の/禾  =  惴
 ⠳⠤⣘ -  る/忄 + 宿 + ゆ/彳  =  愆
 ⣑⠤⢬ -  ゆ/彳 + 宿 + 心  =  愈
 ⠳⠤⢜ -  る/忄 + 宿 + こ/子  =  愡
 ⠳⠤⡺ -  る/忄 + 宿 + つ/土  =  慂
 ⣧⠤⢬ -  み/耳 + 宿 + 心  =  慇
 ⠳⠤⢌ -  る/忄 + 宿 + ⺼  =  慍
 ⢗⠤⢬ -  け/犬 + 宿 + 心  =  慧
 ⠳⠤⢨ -  る/忄 + 宿 + 数  =  慯
 ⢵⠤⢬ -  そ/馬 + 宿 + 心  =  憑
 ⠳⠤⣌ -  る/忄 + 宿 + 日  =  憺
 ⡓⠤⢬ -  ぬ/力 + 宿 + 心  =  懃
 ⠳⠤⡪ -  る/忄 + 宿 + た/⽥  =  懌
 ⠳⠤⠎ -  る/忄 + 宿 + い/糹/#  =  懼
 ⠳⠤⣨ -  る/忄 + 宿 + ん/止  =  懿
 ⡷⠤⡚ -  て/扌 + 宿 + ぬ/力  =  拐
 ⡷⠤⣬ -  て/扌 + 宿 + 囗  =  拭
 ⡷⠤⠪ -  て/扌 + 宿 + ら/月  =  捐
 ⡷⠤⡼ -  て/扌 + 宿 + と/戸  =  掏
 ⡷⠤⣺ -  て/扌 + 宿 + む/車  =  掻
 ⡷⠤⠾ -  て/扌 + 宿 + れ/口  =  揖
 ⡷⠤⡜ -  て/扌 + 宿 + の/禾  =  揣
 ⡷⠤⣌ -  て/扌 + 宿 + 日  =  搨
 ⡷⠤⠎ -  て/扌 + 宿 + い/糹/#  =  摧
 ⡷⠤⢚ -  て/扌 + 宿 + く/艹  =  摸
 ⡷⠤⡨ -  て/扌 + 宿 + を/貝  =  撕
 ⡷⠤⣪ -  て/扌 + 宿 + ま/石  =  擘
 ⡷⠤⢪ -  て/扌 + 宿 + さ/阝  =  擲
 ⡷⠤⡮ -  て/扌 + 宿 + ち/竹  =  擶
 ⠗⠤⡾ -  え/訁 + 宿 + て/扌  =  攣
 ⣕⠤⢚ -  ほ/方 + 宿 + く/艹  =  旒
 ⣕⠤⡜ -  ほ/方 + 宿 + の/禾  =  旙
 ⣅⠤⢪ -  日 + 宿 + さ/阝  =  昂
 ⣅⠤⠜ -  日 + 宿 + お/頁  =  晰
 ⣅⠤⢨ -  日 + 宿 + 数  =  暘
 ⣅⠤⣮ -  日 + 宿 + み/耳  =  曩
 ⠣⠤⢎ -  ら/月 + 宿 + き/木  =  朞
 ⢇⠤⠼ -  き/木 + 宿 + ろ/十  =  枠
 ⢇⠤⢞ -  き/木 + 宿 + け/犬  =  桀
 ⢇⠤⣼ -  き/木 + 宿 + も/門  =  框
 ⢇⠤⡎ -  き/木 + 宿 + に/氵  =  梁
 ⢥⠤⠾ -  心 + 宿 + れ/口  =  梔
 ⢥⠤⡊ -  心 + 宿 + な/亻  =  梛
 ⢥⠤⢨ -  心 + 宿 + 数  =  楊
 ⢇⠤⡸ -  き/木 + 宿 + よ/广  =  楪
 ⢇⠤⢌ -  き/木 + 宿 + ⺼  =  楹
 ⢥⠤⣼ -  心 + 宿 + も/門  =  榧
 ⢥⠤⢌ -  心 + 宿 + ⺼  =  榲
 ⢇⠤⣸ -  き/木 + 宿 + 火  =  樮
 ⢇⠤⡊ -  き/木 + 宿 + な/亻  =  樸
 ⢇⠤⡪ -  き/木 + 宿 + た/⽥  =  樽
 ⢥⠤⡸ -  心 + 宿 + よ/广  =  橘
 ⢇⠤⢸ -  き/木 + 宿 + 氷/氵  =  檄
 ⢥⠤⠮ -  心 + 宿 + り/分  =  檎
 ⢇⠤⣌ -  き/木 + 宿 + 日  =  櫓
 ⢥⠤⣌ -  心 + 宿 + 日  =  櫟
 ⠗⠤⢎ -  え/訁 + 宿 + き/木  =  欒
 ⣕⠤⢨ -  ほ/方 + 宿 + 数  =  殤
 ⣧⠤⡜ -  み/耳 + 宿 + の/禾  =  殷
 ⣣⠤⢼ -  ま/石 + 宿 + そ/馬  =  毅
 ⡷⠤⣘ -  て/扌 + 宿 + ゆ/彳  =  揄
 ⡷⠤⣊ -  て/扌 + 宿 + は/辶  =  搏
 ⡷⠤⢺ -  て/扌 + 宿 + す/発  =  撥
 ⡇⠤⡺ -  に/氵 + 宿 + つ/土  =  涅
 ⡇⠤⡼ -  に/氵 + 宿 + と/戸  =  淘
 ⡇⠤⡜ -  に/氵 + 宿 + の/禾  =  湍
 ⡇⠤⣬ -  に/氵 + 宿 + 囗  =  溷
 ⢱⠤⢘ -  氷/氵 + 宿 + 仁/亻  =  漑
 ⡇⠤⢼ -  に/氵 + 宿 + そ/馬  =  漕
 ⡇⠤⢚ -  に/氵 + 宿 + く/艹  =  漠
 ⡇⠤⣨ -  に/氵 + 宿 + ん/止  =  漱
 ⢱⠤⢞ -  氷/氵 + 宿 + け/犬  =  潅
 ⡇⠤⢜ -  に/氵 + 宿 + こ/子  =  潺
 ⡇⠤⡘ -  に/氵 + 宿 + や/疒  =  澂
 ⡇⠤⠚ -  に/氵 + 宿 + う/宀/#  =  澎
 ⡇⠤⠪ -  に/氵 + 宿 + ら/月  =  澗
 ⡇⠤⣌ -  に/氵 + 宿 + 日  =  澹
 ⡇⠤⣚ -  に/氵 + 宿 + ふ/女  =  濆
 ⣱⠤⢨ -  火 + 宿 + 数  =  煬
 ⣱⠤⢎ -  火 + 宿 + き/木  =  熈
 ⣱⠤⣌ -  火 + 宿 + 日  =  熾
 ⡳⠤⢾ -  つ/土 + 宿 + せ/食  =  燕
 ⣱⠤⣺ -  火 + 宿 + む/車  =  燭
 ⡃⠤⣾ -  な/亻 + 宿 + め/目  =  爽
 ⢵⠤⡼ -  そ/馬 + 宿 + と/戸  =  犀
 ⢗⠤⠪ -  け/犬 + 宿 + ら/月  =  狷
 ⢗⠤⡜ -  け/犬 + 宿 + の/禾  =  猯
 ⢷⠤⢞ -  せ/食 + 宿 + け/犬  =  猷
 ⢗⠤⢚ -  け/犬 + 宿 + く/艹  =  獏
 ⣗⠤⠪ -  へ/⺩ + 宿 + ら/月  =  瑚
 ⣗⠤⡪ -  へ/⺩ + 宿 + た/⽥  =  璢
 ⡣⠤⢼ -  た/⽥ + 宿 + そ/馬  =  疂
 ⡑⠤⢞ -  や/疒 + 宿 + け/犬  =  痙
 ⡑⠤⣚ -  や/疒 + 宿 + ふ/女  =  痿
 ⡑⠤⢌ -  や/疒 + 宿 + ⺼  =  瘟
 ⡑⠤⡸ -  や/疒 + 宿 + よ/广  =  癡
 ⢳⠤⠊ -  す/発 + 宿 + selector 1  =  癶
 ⣅⠤⠼ -  日 + 宿 + ろ/十  =  皐
 ⣅⠤⢜ -  日 + 宿 + こ/子  =  皓
 ⡅⠤⢌ -  ゐ/幺 + 宿 + ⺼  =  盈
 ⡇⠤⢌ -  に/氵 + 宿 + ⺼  =  盥
 ⢳⠤⡪ -  す/発 + 宿 + た/⽥  =  盧
 ⣷⠤⡺ -  め/目 + 宿 + つ/土  =  睚
 ⣷⠤⣪ -  め/目 + 宿 + ま/石  =  睫
 ⣷⠤⣾ -  め/目 + 宿 + め/目  =  瞞
 ⣷⠤⣌ -  め/目 + 宿 + 日  =  瞻
 ⡑⠤⡜ -  や/疒 + 宿 + の/禾  =  矯
 ⣣⠤⣮ -  ま/石 + 宿 + み/耳  =  碌
 ⣣⠤⢞ -  ま/石 + 宿 + け/犬  =  碕
 ⣣⠤⡜ -  ま/石 + 宿 + の/禾  =  磐
 ⣣⠤⢎ -  ま/石 + 宿 + き/木  =  磔
 ⠧⠤⢎ -  り/分 + 宿 + き/木  =  禽
 ⢥⠤⢺ -  心 + 宿 + す/発  =  稷
 ⡕⠤⡼ -  の/禾 + 宿 + と/戸  =  穉
 ⡕⠤⠜ -  の/禾 + 宿 + お/頁  =  穎
 ⡕⠤⣬ -  の/禾 + 宿 + 囗  =  穡
 ⣣⠤⣺ -  ま/石 + 宿 + む/車  =  竣
 ⡧⠤⢪ -  ち/竹 + 宿 + さ/阝  =  笵
 ⡧⠤⣬ -  ち/竹 + 宿 + 囗  =  筏
 ⡧⠤⠸ -  ち/竹 + 宿 + 比  =  箆
 ⡧⠤⡾ -  ち/竹 + 宿 + て/扌  =  箍
 ⡧⠤⠮ -  ち/竹 + 宿 + り/分  =  箒
 ⡧⠤⢼ -  ち/竹 + 宿 + そ/馬  =  篆
 ⡧⠤⣞ -  ち/竹 + 宿 + へ/⺩  =  篇
 ⡧⠤⡊ -  ち/竹 + 宿 + な/亻  =  篋
 ⡧⠤⣺ -  ち/竹 + 宿 + む/車  =  篝
 ⡧⠤⡪ -  ち/竹 + 宿 + た/⽥  =  篳
 ⡧⠤⠺ -  ち/竹 + 宿 + る/忄  =  簍
 ⡧⠤⢎ -  ち/竹 + 宿 + き/木  =  簗
 ⡧⠤⣌ -  ち/竹 + 宿 + 日  =  簪
 ⡧⠤⣚ -  ち/竹 + 宿 + ふ/女  =  籘
 ⡧⠤⣮ -  ち/竹 + 宿 + み/耳  =  籤
 ⡕⠤⡎ -  の/禾 + 宿 + に/氵  =  粱
 ⡕⠤⢪ -  の/禾 + 宿 + さ/阝  =  粲
 ⡕⠤⠪ -  の/禾 + 宿 + ら/月  =  糊
 ⡕⠤⣎ -  の/禾 + 宿 + ひ/辶  =  糒
 ⡅⠤⣾ -  ゐ/幺 + 宿 + め/目  =  緜
 ⠇⠤⣮ -  い/糹/# + 宿 + み/耳  =  緝
 ⠇⠤⣪ -  い/糹/# + 宿 + ま/石  =  縵
 ⣡⠤⢺ -  ん/止 + 宿 + す/発  =  罅
 ⢳⠤⡺ -  す/発 + 宿 + つ/土  =  罫
 ⢵⠤⢜ -  そ/馬 + 宿 + こ/子  =  羔
 ⢵⠤⣸ -  そ/馬 + 宿 + 火  =  羮
 ⢵⠤⢸ -  そ/馬 + 宿 + 氷/氵  =  羯
 ⢅⠤⢼ -  ⺼ + 宿 + そ/馬  =  羸
 ⣳⠤⠜ -  む/車 + 宿 + お/頁  =  翆
 ⣁⠤⡘ -  龸 + 宿 + や/疒  =  耀
 ⡥⠤⢼ -  ゑ/訁 + 宿 + そ/馬  =  聚
 ⣧⠤⡌ -  み/耳 + 宿 + ゐ/幺  =  聯
 ⡵⠤⣚ -  と/戸 + 宿 + ふ/女  =  肆
 ⢅⠤⢌ -  ⺼ + 宿 + ⺼  =  膃
 ⢅⠤⡪ -  ⺼ + 宿 + た/⽥  =  臚
 ⠗⠤⢌ -  え/訁 + 宿 + ⺼  =  臠
 ⣓⠤⡪ -  ふ/女 + 宿 + た/⽥  =  艫
 ⢓⠤⢪ -  く/艹 + 宿 + さ/阝  =  范
 ⢥⠤⣸ -  心 + 宿 + 火  =  荻
 ⢥⠤⡚ -  心 + 宿 + ぬ/力  =  莉
 ⢥⠤⡬ -  心 + 宿 + ゑ/訁  =  菽
 ⢥⠤⢸ -  心 + 宿 + 氷/氵  =  葛
 ⢥⠤⠸ -  心 + 宿 + 比  =  蓖
 ⢓⠤⣪ -  く/艹 + 宿 + ま/石  =  蔓
 ⢓⠤⢸ -  く/艹 + 宿 + 氷/氵  =  蔽
 ⢥⠤⡜ -  心 + 宿 + の/禾  =  蕎
 ⢥⠤⣊ -  心 + 宿 + は/辶  =  薑
 ⢓⠤⢎ -  く/艹 + 宿 + き/木  =  藁
 ⢥⠤⡎ -  心 + 宿 + に/氵  =  藻
 ⢓⠤⡎ -  く/艹 + 宿 + に/氵  =  蘯
 ⣳⠤⡘ -  む/車 + 宿 + や/疒  =  蚩
 ⣳⠤⠼ -  む/車 + 宿 + ろ/十  =  蜃
 ⣳⠤⣞ -  む/車 + 宿 + へ/⺩  =  蝙
 ⣳⠤⢚ -  む/車 + 宿 + く/艹  =  蟇
 ⣳⠤⢬ -  む/車 + 宿 + 心  =  蟋
 ⣳⠤⡼ -  む/車 + 宿 + と/戸  =  蟒
 ⣳⠤⣌ -  む/車 + 宿 + 日  =  蟾
 ⣳⠤⡸ -  む/車 + 宿 + よ/广  =  蠣
 ⣳⠤⣺ -  む/車 + 宿 + む/車  =  蠶
 ⣑⠤⠎ -  ゆ/彳 + 宿 + い/糹/#  =  衢
 ⡗⠤⣞ -  ね/示 + 宿 + へ/⺩  =  褊
 ⡗⠤⢌ -  ね/示 + 宿 + ⺼  =  褞
 ⡗⠤⣪ -  ね/示 + 宿 + ま/石  =  襞
 ⡇⠤⢸ -  に/氵 + 宿 + 氷/氵  =  覈
 ⠗⠤⣞ -  え/訁 + 宿 + へ/⺩  =  諞
 ⠗⠤⡪ -  え/訁 + 宿 + た/⽥  =  謖
 ⠗⠤⠜ -  え/訁 + 宿 + お/頁  =  謫
 ⠗⠤⣌ -  え/訁 + 宿 + 日  =  譫
 ⠗⠤⣪ -  え/訁 + 宿 + ま/石  =  譬
 ⡥⠤⢨ -  ゑ/訁 + 宿 + 数  =  讎
 ⠗⠤⣮ -  え/訁 + 宿 + み/耳  =  讖
 ⠗⠤⡨ -  え/訁 + 宿 + を/貝  =  讚
 ⡵⠤⢺ -  と/戸 + 宿 + す/発  =  豎
 ⢗⠤⢼ -  け/犬 + 宿 + そ/馬  =  豢
 ⡡⠤⣌ -  を/貝 + 宿 + 日  =  贍
 ⢅⠤⡨ -  ⺼ + 宿 + を/貝  =  贏
 ⡡⠤⢺ -  を/貝 + 宿 + す/発  =  贓
 ⣧⠤⣈ -  み/耳 + 宿 + 龸  =  跫
 ⣧⠤⣊ -  み/耳 + 宿 + は/辶  =  跿
 ⣧⠤⡘ -  み/耳 + 宿 + や/疒  =  踟
 ⣧⠤⢾ -  み/耳 + 宿 + せ/食  =  躑
 ⣧⠤⡸ -  み/耳 + 宿 + よ/广  =  躔
 ⣧⠤⣼ -  み/耳 + 宿 + も/門  =  躙
 ⣧⠤⣮ -  み/耳 + 宿 + み/耳  =  躡
 ⣳⠤⣮ -  む/車 + 宿 + み/耳  =  輒
 ⣳⠤⡬ -  む/車 + 宿 + ゑ/訁  =  輟
 ⣳⠤⡮ -  む/車 + 宿 + ち/竹  =  轜
 ⣳⠤⠾ -  む/車 + 宿 + れ/口  =  轡
 ⣳⠤⡪ -  む/車 + 宿 + た/⽥  =  轤
 ⣳⠤⡌ -  む/車 + 宿 + ゐ/幺  =  辮
 ⣇⠤⠬ -  ひ/辶 + 宿 + 宿  =  辷
 ⣇⠤⣸ -  ひ/辶 + 宿 + 火  =  逖
 ⣇⠤⡪ -  ひ/辶 + 宿 + た/⽥  =  逹
 ⣇⠤⡚ -  ひ/辶 + 宿 + ぬ/力  =  邉
 ⢣⠤⣬ -  さ/阝 + 宿 + 囗  =  鄙
 ⢣⠤⡾ -  さ/阝 + 宿 + て/扌  =  鄭
 ⢷⠤⢚ -  せ/食 + 宿 + く/艹  =  醯
 ⢃⠤⡬ -  か/金 + 宿 + ゑ/訁  =  錣
 ⢃⠤⣾ -  か/金 + 宿 + め/目  =  錦
 ⢃⠤⠜ -  か/金 + 宿 + お/頁  =  鏑
 ⢃⠤⣪ -  か/金 + 宿 + ま/石  =  鏝
 ⢃⠤⠼ -  か/金 + 宿 + ろ/十  =  鐐
 ⢃⠤⠎ -  か/金 + 宿 + い/糹/#  =  鐫
 ⢃⠤⡪ -  か/金 + 宿 + た/⽥  =  鐸
 ⢃⠤⢺ -  か/金 + 宿 + す/発  =  鑪
 ⢃⠤⠮ -  か/金 + 宿 + り/分  =  鑰
 ⢃⠤⡨ -  か/金 + 宿 + を/貝  =  鑽
 ⢃⠤⠞ -  か/金 + 宿 + え/訁  =  鑾
 ⢃⠤⡜ -  か/金 + 宿 + の/禾  =  鑿
 ⣵⠤⠬ -  も/門 + 宿 + 宿  =  閂
 ⣵⠤⣪ -  も/門 + 宿 + ま/石  =  闢
 ⢣⠤⠎ -  さ/阝 + 宿 + い/糹/#  =  隰
 ⢣⠤⢼ -  さ/阝 + 宿 + そ/馬  =  隲
 ⡃⠤⢾ -  な/亻 + 宿 + せ/食  =  雁
 ⡧⠤⢮ -  ち/竹 + 宿 + し/巿  =  霈
 ⡧⠤⡎ -  ち/竹 + 宿 + に/氵  =  霑
 ⡧⠤⡜ -  ち/竹 + 宿 + の/禾  =  霞
 ⡧⠤⠪ -  ち/竹 + 宿 + ら/月  =  霸
 ⡧⠤⣪ -  ち/竹 + 宿 + ま/石  =  霹
 ⡧⠤⢸ -  ち/竹 + 宿 + 氷/氵  =  靄
 ⣣⠤⣸ -  ま/石 + 宿 + 火  =  靡
 ⣳⠤⡎ -  む/車 + 宿 + に/氵  =  飃
 ⢷⠤⠚ -  せ/食 + 宿 + う/宀/#  =  餮
 ⢷⠤⢌ -  せ/食 + 宿 + ⺼  =  饂
 ⢷⠤⢎ -  せ/食 + 宿 + き/木  =  饉
 ⢵⠤⢊ -  そ/馬 + 宿 + か/金  =  駻
 ⢵⠤⣺ -  そ/馬 + 宿 + む/車  =  駿
 ⢵⠤⣞ -  そ/馬 + 宿 + へ/⺩  =  騙
 ⢵⠤⢚ -  そ/馬 + 宿 + く/艹  =  驀
 ⢵⠤⡜ -  そ/馬 + 宿 + の/禾  =  驕
 ⢵⠤⡪ -  そ/馬 + 宿 + た/⽥  =  驢
 ⢵⠤⢎ -  そ/馬 + 宿 + き/木  =  驥
 ⢅⠤⠪ -  ⺼ + 宿 + ら/月  =  髓
 ⡵⠤⣜ -  と/戸 + 宿 + ほ/方  =  髣
 ⡵⠤⠾ -  と/戸 + 宿 + れ/口  =  髭
 ⣑⠤⠾ -  ゆ/彳 + 宿 + れ/口  =  鬻
 ⠕⠤⣘ -  お/頁 + 宿 + ゆ/彳  =  魍
 ⢷⠤⡎ -  せ/食 + 宿 + に/氵  =  鮨
 ⢷⠤⡼ -  せ/食 + 宿 + と/戸  =  鰭
 ⢷⠤⣪ -  せ/食 + 宿 + ま/石  =  鰻
 ⢷⠤⡪ -  せ/食 + 宿 + た/⽥  =  鱸
 ⢣⠤⢾ -  さ/阝 + 宿 + せ/食  =  鴛
 ⡇⠤⢾ -  に/氵 + 宿 + せ/食  =  鴻
 ⣥⠤⢾ -  囗 + 宿 + せ/食  =  鵞
 ⢓⠤⢾ -  く/艹 + 宿 + せ/食  =  鵠
 ⡗⠤⢾ -  ね/示 + 宿 + せ/食  =  鵲
 ⢕⠤⢾ -  こ/子 + 宿 + せ/食  =  鶲
 ⠧⠤⢾ -  り/分 + 宿 + せ/食  =  鷁
 ⡕⠤⢾ -  の/禾 + 宿 + せ/食  =  鷭
 ⡱⠤⢾ -  よ/广 + 宿 + せ/食  =  鷹
 ⡡⠤⢾ -  を/貝 + 宿 + せ/食  =  鸚
 ⠗⠤⢾ -  え/訁 + 宿 + せ/食  =  鸞
 ⣇⠤⠬ -  ひ/辶 + 宿 + 宿  =  辷
 ⣵⠤⠬ -  も/門 + 宿 + 宿  =  閂
 ⠥⢶⠊ -  宿 + せ/食 + selector 1  =  鳬

Notes

Braille patterns